The County of Peebles was the world's first four-masted, iron-hulled full-rigged ship. It was built during 1875, by Barclay Curle Shipbuilders in Glasgow, Scotland, for the shipping company R & J Craig of Glasgow. Its rig was 'Scottish style', with royal sails above double top-sails and single topgallants.

County of Peebles represented an important development of sailing ship design, which allowed wind-powered ships to compete successfully on long haul routes with steamships during the last quarter of the 19th century. With its success R & J Craig ordered a further eleven similar four-masted 'full-rigged ships' for the thriving Indian jute trade, forming what was referred to as the Scottish East India Line.  Using the pattern of County of Peebles, the other ships ordered were also named after Scottish counties as follows: County of Caithness (launched in 1876), County of Inverness (1877), County of Cromarty (1878), County of Dumfries (1878), County of Kinross (1878), County of Selkirk (1878), County of Aberdeen (1879), County of Haddington (1879), County of Edinburgh (1885), County of Roxburgh (1886), and County of Linlithgow (1887).

In 1898, County of Peebles was sold to the Chilean Navy.  Renamed Muñoz Gamero, it was used as a coal hulk at Punta Arenas on the Strait of Magellan. During the mid-1960s it was beached as a breakwater in Punta Arenas, where it lay as of 2017, with masts cut down.

References

External links
 http://www.vortext.org/scotclip/  ScottishClipper Website
Clyde-Built Ship Database

Windjammers
Ships built in Glasgow
1875 ships
Punta Arenas
Buildings and structures in Magallanes Region